Diocese of Argeș may refer to the following ecclesiastical jurisdictions :

 the suppressed (Roman Catholic) Latin Diocese of Argeș
 the Romanian Orthodox Archdiocese of Argeș and Muscel